Boris Petrovsky (27 June 1908 – 4 May 2004) was a Russian general surgeon who was the health minister of the Soviet Union in the period 1965–1980.

Early life and education

Petrovsky was born in Yessentuki on 27 June 1908. His parents were Vasiliy and Lydia Petrovsky. His father was a physician.

Petrovsky applied for the Medicine Faculty of Moscow University, but he was not accepted due to the restricted quota and was transferred to the Engineering Faculty of the same university. However, through the help of Nadezhda Krupskaya, Vladimir Lenin's widow, who was serving as the deputy education minister Petrovsky managed to enroll to the Medicine Faculty and received a degree in medicine. In 1933 he became a research investigator at the Moscow Institute for Oncology where he received a PhD completing his thesis on the transfusion of blood and blood substitutes in oncology. His second thesis which was required to pursue an academic career was about his experience as a military surgeon during the wars with Finland and Germany.

Career
Petrovsky served in the Red Army as a military surgeon during the wars with Finland in 1939-40 and during World War II with Germany. In 1945 he was appointed deputy director of the Research Institute for Experimental and Clinical Surgery where he extensively studied oesophageal surgery. In 1948 Petrovsky was promoted to the title of professor of general surgery at the Moscow State Medical Institute. In the period between 1949 and 1951 he worked at Budapest University as the chairman of hospital surgery and director of a surgery clinic. Then he was named chief surgeon at the Kremlin Hospital in Moscow. Next he was appointed chairman of surgery at the Moscow Medical Institute and in 1956 he was named the chairman of surgery at the Moscow State Medical Institute.

In 1965 Petrovsky carried out the first kidney transplant in the Soviet Union. In September of the same year he was appointed minister of health. When he was in office, he continued such operations and implemented more than thirty kidney transplants until 1968. During his term the Oath of a Soviet Physician began to be used in 1971 when it was accepted by the Supreme Soviet of which he was a member. On 23 May 1972 Petrovsky and US Secretary of State William P. Rogers signed a five-year agreement for a cooperative health program.

Petrovsky was also a member of the USSR Academy of Medical Sciences.

Later years, personal life and death

Petrovsky married Ekaterina Timofeeva, a biologist-researcher at a university. They had a daughter, Marina, who was a physician. He died on 4 May 2004.

Awards
Petrovsky was awarded the Order of Lenin in 1960 and the Hero of Socialist Labour in 1968. He was elected as the Honorary Fellowship by the Royal College of Surgeons of England and was the sixth Russian scientist who was given this title after Victor Pachoutine, Nikolai Velyaminov, Vladimir Oppel, Nicolas Burdenko and Sergei Yudin. He was also a recipient of honorary fellowship of the Royal College of Surgeons in Ireland, of the Royal College of Surgeons of Edinburgh, of the surgical societies of Poland, Hungary, Italy and Cuba, of the Czechoslovakian Medical Society and of the French Surgical Academy.

Work
One of the books written by Petrovsky was published in 1949 entitled Surgical Treatment of Vascular Injuries. In 1995 he published his memoirs, Man. Medicine. Life.

References

External links

20th-century Russian scientists
1908 births
2004 deaths
Soviet Ministers of Health
Central Committee of the Communist Party of the Soviet Union members
Recipients of the Order of Lenin
People from Yessentuki
Moscow State University alumni
Academicians of the USSR Academy of Medical Sciences
Soviet surgeons
Heroes of Socialist Labour
Soviet military doctors
Academic staff of Eötvös Loránd University
Fellows of the Royal College of Surgeons
Fellows of the Royal College of Surgeons in Ireland
Fellows of the Royal College of Surgeons of Edinburgh
Léon Bernard Foundation Prize laureates